The 1972 Primera División season was the 81st season of top-flight football in Argentina. Banfield was penalised with a 4-month suspension and the subsequent points deduction after a proved bribe. The case ... back to the 1971 Metropolitano when Banfield was about to be relegated along with Los Andes. A Banfield executive offered Ferro Carril Oeste players (their rivals in the last fixture of the tournament) a high amount of money to fix the match. Nevertheless, the meeting was reported to the police who arrested the executive. Banfield would be then penalised by the AFA.

With Lanús (1970 Primera B Metropolitana champions) as the only team promoted from the lower division, San Lorenzo won both tournaments, Metropolitano and Nacional (9th and 10th league titles). San Lorenzo and River Plate (Torneo Nacional champion and runner-up) qualified for the 1973 Copa Libertadores. On the other hand, Banfield and Lanús were relegated via Torneo Reclasificatorio.

Metropolitano Championship

Final standings

Reclasificatorio Tournament

Relegation table 
To determine relegations of teams playing the Reclasificatorio, points earned in Metropolitano and Reclasificatorio were taken into account. The two clubs with the lowest points earned were relegated.

Top scorers

Nacional Championship

Group A

Group B

Semifinal

Final

Match details

Top scorers

References

Argentine Primera División seasons
p
p
Argentine Primera Division
1